The Outforce is a traditional top-down real-time strategy game played across a battlefield in space. It's the first game from O3 Games, which later became Starbreeze Studios.

Gameplay
The Outforce is a real-time strategy game set in the depths of space. There are three races from which to choose, and more than 120 different units available, including tow ships, phasing units, and self-destructing units. The 3-D environment features a free-floating camera with a variable zoom field. The game's artificial intelligence has a genetic learning algorithm, and the physics system includes pressure waves, elastic collisions, gravity, and push-and-pull force. Up to eight players can battle it out over the Internet or on a LAN.

Reception

The game received "mixed" reviews according to video game review aggregator Metacritic.  Nevertheless, it was a success for O3 Games.

References

External links
The Outforce on the Strategy First Website

MoDDB site
Discord server
Zoom-platform buy original game

2000 video games
Real-time strategy video games
Starbreeze Studios games
Video games developed in Sweden
Video games set in outer space
Windows games
Windows-only games
Strategy First games